Droguetia is a genus of flowering plants belonging to the family Urticaceae.

Its wide native range is Africa and the Arabian Peninsula and China.

Its genus name of Droguetia is in honour of Marc Julien Droguet (1769–1836), French naval doctor. and it was published in Voy. Uranie on page 505 in 1830.

Known species:
Droguetia ambigua 
Droguetia debilis 
Droguetia gaudichaudiana 
Droguetia hildebrandtii 
Droguetia humbertii 
Droguetia iners 
Droguetia leptostachys

References

Urticaceae
Urticaceae genera
Plants described in 1830